...Waltzing Alone is the first full-length album from the Dublin, Ireland folk-pop band The Guggenheim Grotto. It was originally released in Ireland on September 9, 2005 by Rykodisc, and then on September 26, 2006 in the US and Canada by United For Opportunity.

The song "Philosophia" was featured as the iTunes free download for the week of April 16, 2007.

Track listing

References

2005 albums
The Guggenheim Grotto albums
Rykodisc albums